Paralbara watsoni is a moth in the family Drepanidae. It was described by Jeremy Daniel Holloway in 1976. It is found on Sumatra, Borneo and Peninsular Malaysia.

References

External links

Moths described in 1976
Drepaninae